SouthPark Mall is an enclosed shopping mall located in Strongsville, Ohio a Greater Cleveland suburb. Its anchor stores are Dick's Sporting Goods, Dillard's, JCPenney, Macy's, and a 14-Screen Cinemark Movie Theater. Kohl's is also an anchor, though located on the outskirts of the plaza. The mall features over 170 specialty shops, restaurants, and is the largest retail destination in Northern Ohio.

History
As early as the 1960s, the intersection of Royalton Road (SR 82) and Howe Road in the rapidly expanding suburb was coveted for commercial use. A secret plan by former Cleveland Browns owner Art Modell to build a new stadium at the site was exposed by the media in the 1980s and subsequently scrapped. The land was eventually sold to the Richard E. Jacobs Group, which later unveiled its first plans for a major mall. The Higbee Company and May Company Ohio, Cleveland's two major department store companies, announced that they would join as anchors.

Plans were approved in 1991 and ground was broken in 1995, with the $200 million SouthPark Center opening on October 16, 1996. The completed center included not only Dillard's (the renamed Higbee's) and Kaufmann's (the renamed May Company, now Macy's) department stores, but also JCPenney, Sears, over 100 retailers, a food court, The Cleveland Clinic and restaurants outlying the perimeter. Kohl's also joined as an anchor, though on the outlying perimeter road surrounding the mall. The project also made allowances for an eventual fifth mall anchor store location — originally planned to be Nordstrom — later to become Dick's Sporting Goods, plus substantial peripheral development. The shopping center is noteworthy for its lush landscaping and its coordinated upscale architectural treatment. Its interior is roofed by grand barrel-vaulted truss-work and plentiful skylights leading to two grand porte-cochere (massive, extended greeting canopies) above its main entrances. It has proven a strong draw and popular destination for local and regional residents alike.

Westfield Group acquired the shopping center in early 2002 from the Richard E. Jacobs Group, and renamed it "Westfield Shoppingtown SouthPark", dropping the "Shoppingtown" name in June 2005. In 2006, it commenced a $60 million expansion and reconfiguration of the center, thus adding 25 upscale shops and restaurants, a rear porte-cochere entrance, and a 14-Screen Cinemark Movie Theater. Dick's Sporting Goods was also added at this time to become the mall's newest anchor store.

In April 2012, the mall was sold to Starwood Capital Group, along with seven other Westfield properties. As a result, Starwood changed the name to SouthPark Mall.

In May 2016, Starwood Retail Partners announced the opening of The Commons At SouthPark, a $14 million redevelopment of a former Giant Eagle located on Rt. 82. New shops/restaurants included DSW, Michaels, Brown Aveda Institute, Orangetheory Fitness, The Vitamin Shoppe, Spavia, The Rail, and first to market CoreLife Eatery.

On May 31, 2018, Sears Holdings announced that the Sears location at SouthPark would be closing in September 2018 as part of a plan to close 72 stores nationwide. The Sears store officially closed on September 2, 2018.

In 2018, H&M announced the expansion of its SouthPark Mall Store. The new store re-opened June 13, 2019. As of October 2019, SouthPark Mall remains the largest retail destination in Northern Ohio.

On April 28, 2021, SouthPark changed ownership from Starwood Retail Partners to a company related to Kize Capital LP with Spinoso Real Estate Group managing the mall.

Retailers
Situated about SouthPark's site perimeter is The Commons at SouthPark, Kohl's, The Cleveland Clinic, KeyBank, and several restaurants.

Other notable retailers include: ALDO, Chico's, Carter's, J.Jill, Abercrombie & Fitch, Forever 21, The Painted Penguin, Sephora, MAC Cosmetics inside Macy's, H&M, Aveda, PANDORA, Swarovski, The Buckle, Build-A-Bear Workshop, Pink, Hollister Co., Vans, Victoria's Secret, Lucky Shoes, Apricot Lane, Francesca's, Learning Express Toys, Books-A-Million, House of Hoops, Aerie, & Trollbeads.

Other Events
On March 24, 2004, Avril Lavigne made a brief performance of her hit songs and new releases, as part of her Live by Surprise Tour.

See also
 List of shopping malls in the United States

References

External links
 
 Official Twitter account

Shopping malls in Cuyahoga County, Ohio
Shopping malls established in 1996
Strongsville, Ohio